James Thomas McGee (died 19 January 1956) was an Irish politician. He was an independent member of Seanad Éireann from 1938 to 1956. He was first elected to the 3rd Seanad in 1938 by the Administrative Panel. He was re-elected at the 1943, 1944, 1948, 1951 and 1954 Seanad elections. He died in office in 1956, and William Woods was elected to fill the vacancy.

He was Cathaoirleach of Louth County Council from 1925 to 1955.

References

Year of birth missing
1956 deaths
Members of the 3rd Seanad
Members of the 4th Seanad
Members of the 5th Seanad
Members of the 6th Seanad
Members of the 7th Seanad
Members of the 8th Seanad
People from County Louth
Local councillors in County Louth
Independent members of Seanad Éireann